Brompton cocktail, sometimes called Brompton mixture or Brompton's cocktail, was an elixir meant for use as a pain suppressant dosed for prophylaxis. Made from morphine or diacetylmorphine (heroin), cocaine, highly-pure ethyl alcohol (some recipes specify gin), and sometimes with chlorpromazine (Thorazine) to counteract nausea, it was given to terminally-ill individuals (especially cancer patients) to relieve pain and promote sociability near death. A common formulation included "a variable amount of morphine, 10 mg of cocaine, 2.5 mL of 98% ethyl alcohol, 5 mL of syrup BP and a variable amount of chloroform water."  Brompton's cocktail was given most in the mid twentieth century. It is now considered obsolete.

History
The original idea for an oral mixture of morphine and cocaine helping patients in agony with advanced disease is credited to surgeon Herbert Snow in 1896.  The Brompton cocktail is named after the Royal Brompton Hospital in London, England, where the formulation of this mixture was standardized in the late 1920s for patients with cancer. While its use has been rare in the 21st century, it is not entirely unheard of today. It was far more common in the late 19th and early 20th centuries.

Variants
Some specifications for variants of Brompton cocktail call for methadone, hydromorphone, diamorphine (heroin), or other strong opioids in the place of morphine; diphenhydramine or tincture of cannabis in place of the chlorpromazine; and methamphetamine, amphetamine, dextroamphetamine, co-phenylcaine (lidocaine and phenylephrine hydrochloride), methylphenidate, or other stimulants in the place of cocaine. The original recipe for Brompton cocktail also calls for chloroform, cherry syrup to help mask the bitter taste of some of the components, and distilled water in some quantity to dilute the chloroform (hence, chloroform water) or to add volume to allow for more precise titration of doses.

Synergy among constituents
While each of the ingredients combats pain or other problems that occur with it in those who may be nauseated from effects of chemotherapy, radiation or high and escalating doses of morphine (which can also cause somnolence or sleepiness, necessitating the stimulant), it is also anecdotally acknowledged that the whole is greater than the sum of its parts, with the various active ingredients all potentiating the morphine or other opioid in their own ways.  The synergy between opioid analgesics and centrally-acting stimulants is widely reported and commonly used: for example, the caffeine content of many codeine-based pain relievers, and prescription of dextroamphetamine or methylphenidate to patients on high doses of opioids both to combat somnolence from the painkillers and to boost their pain-killing ability.

See also
 Palliative care
 Pain management
 Speedball (drug)

References

External links
 
 
 

Palliative care
Historical polysubstance drinks